Phosphodiesterase type 11 (PDE11) is a type of phosphodiesterase enzyme.

An inhibitor is BC11-38.

References

Enzymes